Pathward Financial, Inc. is a United States bank with retail branches in Iowa and South Dakota. It offers traditional banking services designed to serve the needs of individual, agricultural, and business depositors and borrowers.

MetaBank issued debit cards of up to $600 sent to millions of Americans as part of the second round of COVID-19 Economic Impact Payments in January 2021. MetaBank acts as the U.S. Treasury's "financial agent" for this purpose.

Locations and divisions

MetaBank is headquartered in Sioux Falls, South Dakota. The retail banking division has locations in four areas: Central Iowa; Storm Lake, Iowa; Brookings, South Dakota; and Sioux Falls. There are branch locations in the following cities:

 Brookings, South Dakota
 Des Moines, Iowa
 Sioux Falls, South Dakota
 Storm Lake, Iowa
 Urbandale, Iowa
 West Des Moines, Iowa

MetaBank is a Member of the Federal Deposit Insurance Corporation. MetaBank operates in several segments within the Banking and Payments industries: MetaBank, its traditional retail banking operation; Meta Payment Systems, its electronic payments division; AFS/IBEX, its insurance premium financing division; and Refund Advantage, EPS Financial and Specialty Consumer Services, its tax-related financial solutions divisions.

Meta Financial Group, Inc., is the bank holding company that owns MetaBank.

MetaBank Corporate Services and Meta Payment Systems division are headquartered in Sioux Falls, South Dakota The AFS/IBEX division is headquartered in Dallas, Texas, with an additional office in Newport Beach, California. Refund Advantage is headquartered in Louisville, Kentucky. EPS is headquartered in Easton, Pennsylvania. SCS is headquartered in Hurst, Texas.

Meta Payment Systems (MPS) offers products in the following areas: prepaid cards, credit products, electronic funds transfer, Automated teller machine sponsorship and tax-related financial solutions.

AFS/IBEX provides short-term, collateralized financing to facilitate the purchase of insurance for commercial property, casualty and liability risk. Based in Dallas, Texas, AFS/IBEX originates loans through a network of independent insurance agencies.

Refund Advantage, based in Louisville, Kentucky, provides tax refund-transfer software for Electronic Return Originators (EROs) and their customers. Their software is used in over 10,000 locations nationwide and processes over one million refund-transfers a year.

EPS Financial (EPS) provides refund settlement products, prepaid payroll card solutions and merchant services. EPS is headquartered in Easton, Pennsylvania.

Specialty Consumer Services (SCS) provides consumer tax advance services through its proprietary underwriting model and loan management system. Based in Hurst, Texas, SCS was a pioneer for no-fee refund advance products.

History

Founding

MetaBank was founded as Storm Lake Savings and Loan Association in 1954 by Stanley H. Haahr, who remained on the Board of Directors until 1990 and served as board chairman from 1981 to 1990. The bank purchased the Bradford Hotel property in Storm Lake at Fifth and Erie in 1970, and construction was completed on the bank's new headquarters in 1972. By 1993, the bank changed its name from First Federal Savings and Loan Association of Storm Lake to First Federal Savings Bank of the Midwest, a subsidiary of First Midwest Financial, Inc. On Sept. 20, 1993, 1.9 million shares of stock in First Midwest Financial, Inc., were issued at $10 per share and began trading on the NASDAQ stock market under the symbol “CASH.”

Acquisitions
In 1994, Brookings Federal Bank, a federal savings bank in Brookings, South Dakota, was acquired and operated as the Brookings Federal Bank Division of First Federal Savings Bank of the Midwest. In 1996, Iowa Savings Bank in Des Moines was purchased and operated as the Iowa Savings Bank Division of First Federal Savings Bank of the Midwest.

In January 2018, Metabank acquired Crestmark Bank.

In March 2020, Metabank announced the sale of its community bank division to Central Bank, a state-chartered bank headquartered in Storm Lake, Iowa.

Expansion

First Federal opened the doors to its first Sioux Falls office – a temporary facility – on Sept. 6, 2000. In 2004, the Meta Payment Systems (MPS) division was established in Sioux Falls. The next year, in 2005, all bank divisions under First Federal changed their names to MetaBank, inhabiting four market areas: Central Iowa; Northwest Iowa; Brookings; and Sioux Falls.
In 2009, MetaBank introduced a new retail product line and the MPS division became a leading issuer of rebate and gift cards in the United States and worldwide and one of the top issuers of Visa, MasterCard and Discover prepaid cards.

In 2014, MetaBank announced the acquisition of AFS/IBEX Financial Services Inc., an insurance premium financing company based in Dallas, Texas.

MetaBank announced the acquisition of Refund Advantage, a tax refund-transfer software company based in Louisville, Kentucky, in 2015.

In 2016, MetaBank announced two acquisitions: EPS Financial in November and Specialty Consumer Services (SCS) in December. EPS provides tax-related financial transaction solutions. They are headquartered in Easton, Pennsylvania SCS provides consumer tax advance services through its underwriting and loan management system. SCS is based in Hurst, Texas.

Corporate governance

James S. Haahr became President and Chief Executive Officer of Meta Financial Group, Inc., in 1993. J. Tyler Haahr took over the position of President and CEO in 2005. In 2011, James Haahr resigned as Chairman, and J. Tyler Haahr became Chairman and CEO. James and Tyler Haahr are the son and grandson of founder Stanley Haahr.

Brad Hanson has served as President of the Meta Payment Systems division since its inception in 2004. He was appointed President of Meta Financial Group and MetaBank in 2013.

Glen Herrick joined MetaBank in 2013 and serves as Executive Vice President and Chief Financial Officer of Meta Financial Group and MetaBank.

Sale of trademark and rebranding

In December 2021, Meta Financial Group sold its "Meta" trademark to Facebook's parent company (now called Meta Platforms) for $60 million. The agreement required Meta Financial Group to phase out the trademark within one year. In March 2022, the financial services company announced it would change its brand to Pathward.

Awards and honors

MetaBank was included among the Sandler O’Neill and Partners "Bank and Thrift Sm-All Stars – Class of 2012", which ranked the top 25 performing small-cap banks in the country. MetaBank was also named fifth in the nation among top-performing, mid-size banks by the American Banking Association Journal in 2013. MetaBank ranked among the top 25 among the nation's community banks and thrifts, according to American Banker magazine, in 2013 and was named to the Top 200 Community Banks and Thrifts list again in 2014. MetaBank was named one of the top performing banks with assets of $1B to $10B by American Banker in 2015. AFS/IBEX division was selected by the Independent Insurance Agents of Texas (IIAT) to be its exclusive premium finance company of choice in 2015. In 2016, Bank Director Magazine named MetaBank the number one top growth bank of 7,000 banks nationwide. MetaBank received an investment grade rating by Kroll Bond Rating Agency in 2016. EPS was named "Business of the Year (25–100 employees) by Lehigh Valley Business in 2016.

Meta Payment Systems division cofounder and MetaBank President Brad Hanson received a 2009 Industry Achievement Award from Paybefore in 2009. MetaBank's Senior Vice President and Chief Legal Officer John Hagy was named among the Top 10 Payments Lawyers by Paybefore in 2015.

References

External links

Banks based in South Dakota
Banks based in Iowa
Companies listed on the Nasdaq